Edward Alfred Little (April 9, 1859 – February 23, 1934) was an Ontario farmer and political figure. He represented Cardwell in the Legislative Assembly of Ontario from 1894 to 1898 as a  Conservative-Protestant Protective Association member and from 1898 to 1906 as a Conservative member.

He was born in Canada West, the son of William Carruthers Little, and educated in Barrie. He served as deputy reeve for Innisfil Township and was a school trustee. In 1906, he was appointed registrar for the Surrogate Court for Simcoe County.

References

External links

1859 births
1934 deaths
Progressive Conservative Party of Ontario MPPs
Protestant Protective Association MPPs